Manickavasagar is a 1939 Indian Tamil-language film directed by T. R. Sundaram and was produced by V. S. M. Gopalakrishna Iyer. The film stars M. M. Dandapani Desikar and M. S. Devasena.

Plot 
The film depicts the life story of Saint Manikkavacakar.

Cast 
The list was compiled from the book Thamizh Cinema Ulagam

Male cast
M. M. Dandapani Desikar  Manickavasagar
P. B. Rangachari  Pandiyan
C. V. V. Panthulu  Lord Shiva
N. S. Krishnan  Mestri Vengupillai
S. S. Kokko (Real name: Pasupuleti Srinivasulu Naidu)  Kalimuthu
T. S. Durairaj  Chithal (Labour Assistant)
T. V. Devanadha Iyengar  Velayutha Kothan
K. V. Venkatarama Iyer  Pattar, stammerer
R. P. Yagneshwara Iyer  Pattar
P. Ramaiah Sastry  Deekshitar
Professor Mallaiah  Atheist Minister
K. R. Sundaresan  Thiruchitrambala Yogi
S. R. Sami  Minister, Old man
Sami Sadasivam  Old man
K. R. Singh  Atheist King
M. N. S. Parthasarathy  Atheist Minister
Subramanian  Minister's stableman
Narayana Singh  Soldier, Labourer
Saminathan  Soldier
Venu  Civilian T0m-tom beater
Mylvagana Iyer  Temple priest
A. Narasimha Raju
K. P. Lakshmanan
N. M. Rajasami Naidu
Ramalingam

Female cast
M. S. Devasena  Manonmani
M. N. S. Shantha Devi  Manohari
T. A. Mathuram  Amrutham
P. S. Gnanam  Karumbu
U. R. Jeevaratnam  Dumb woman
C. T. Rajakantham   Ponnammal
Seethalakshmi  Deekshitar's wife
Devaram Rajamma  Vandhi
Pushpa Rajamani
P. K. Vanaja
Aandaal
Chellam
Akilambal

Production 
The film was produced by V. S. M. Gopalakrishna Iyer and was directed by T. R. Sundaram. Mayavaram K. Thiyagaraja Desikar wrote the screenplay and dialogues. Cinematography was handled by P. V. Krishna Iyer and audiography was done by Sardar Eswara Singh. The film was shot and processed at Modern Theatres, Salem.

Soundtrack 
Some of the hymns sung by Saint Manickavasagar was included in the film. Mayavaram K. Thiyagaraja Desikar wrote the lyrics for the other songs. No music director was credited but the names of instrumentalists are credited.
Orchestra
G. Rajagopal Naidu - Fiddle (Violin)
C. Rangasami - Harmonium
K. Ambigadas - Tabla
B. Rangaiya Naidu - Clarinet
C. Ramachandran - Piano, Dilruba

List of songs (Manickavasagar hymns)

Thiruvalar Thamarai is from Thirukovaiyar; others are Thiruvasagam

Songs penned by K. Thiyagaraja Desikar

References

External links 

1930s Tamil-language films
Hindu devotional films
Hindu mythological films
Films scored by G. Rajagopal Naidu